Shur (sometimes rendered in translations as Sur) is a location mentioned several times in the Hebrew Bible. 

James K. Hoffmeier believes that the 'way of Shur' was located along the Wadi Tumilat — an arable strip of land to the east of the Nile Delta, serving as the ancient transit route between Ancient Egypt and Canaan across the Sinai Peninsula.

When Hagar ran away from Sarah (Abram's wife, her owner), "the Angel of the Lord found her ... by the fountain in the way to Shur" (Book of Genesis, KJV).

Shur is also mentioned in 1 Samuel 15:7 — "Then Saul slaughtered the Amalekites from Havilah all the way to Shur, east of Egypt." According to the Book of Exodus, Marah is located in the "wilderness of Shur".

Easton's Bible Dictionary (1893) says that Shur is "a part, probably, of the Arabian desert, on the north-eastern border of Egypt, giving its name to a wilderness extending from Egypt toward Philistia (Gen. 16:7; 20:1; 25:18; Ex. 15:22). The name was probably given to it from the wall which the Egyptians built to defend their frontier on the north-east from the desert tribes. This wall or line of fortifications extended from Pelusium to Heliopolis."

References

Book of Exodus
Book of Genesis
Books of Samuel
Torah places
Wadi Tumilat
Hagar